Alan Jesús Alegre (born 3 February 1991) is an Argentine professional footballer who plays as a defender for Deportes Temuco.

Career
Alegre started with the youth team of Argentine Primera División side Quilmes, he was promoted into the club's first-team in 2013 and made his debut on 8 June against Arsenal de Sarandí in the 2012–13 Argentine Primera División. He made one further appearance in the same season against Godoy Cruz on 18 June. 2013–14 saw Alegre make nineteen appearances for Quilmes, during that time, on 12 October 2013, he scored his first professional career goal versus Belgrano; a first half winner in an away victory. In the next three campaigns, Alegre made forty-seven appearances in the league whilst also receiving his first career red card.

On 1 July 2016, Alegre joined fellow Primera División club Aldosivi. He scored three goals in eighteen league appearances in a season that ended in relegation for Aldosivi. He made his 100th career appearance in March 2018 against Boca Unidos. At the end of the following November, Alegre left Aldosivi to rejoin Quilmes.

Career statistics

Honours
Aldosivi
Primera B Nacional: 2017–18

References

External links
 

1991 births
Living people
Argentine footballers
Argentine expatriate footballers
People from Quilmes
Association football defenders
Quilmes Atlético Club footballers
Aldosivi footballers
Argentine Primera División players
Primera Nacional players
Deportes Temuco footballers
Primera B de Chile players
Expatriate footballers in Chile
Sportspeople from Buenos Aires Province